Karel Kovář may refer to:
 Karel Kovář (rower)
 Karel Kovář (figure skater)